New Girl (titled onscreen for the first four seasons as New Girl Jess) is an American television sitcom created by Elizabeth Meriwether and produced by 20th Television for Fox that originally aired from September 20, 2011, to May 15, 2018. The series revolves around a kooky teacher, Jessica Day (Zooey Deschanel), after she moves into a Los Angeles loft with three men, Nick Miller (Jake Johnson), Winston Schmidt (Max Greenfield), and Winston Bishop (Lamorne Morris); their former roommate Coach (Damon Wayans Jr.) and Jess' best friend Cece Parekh  (Hannah Simone) are also part of the series. The show combines comedy and drama elements as the characters, who are in their early thirties, deal with relationship issues and career choices. New Girl is a joint production between Elizabeth Meriwether Pictures and 20th Century Fox Television and is syndicated by 20th Television.

Produced in Los Angeles as a single-camera comedy, New Girl is an ensemble show aimed at a general audience. Most episodes are anchored around Jess, who, according to series creator Meriwether, would have played a side character on other shows. The show's first marketing push was on Zooey Deschanel and the promotional tagline "Simply Adorkable". The producers rejected early criticism of Jess's girlishness, insisting that Jess was not meant to be emblematic of all women. Instead, they aimed to portray realistic, emotionally driven characters and to approach the show from that angle rather than simply firing off punchlines. Approximately 20% of each episode was completely improvised, which contributed to the series' success.

New Girl has received acclaim from critics and was named one of the best new comedies of the 2011 fall season. The pilot episode drew 10.28 million U.S. viewers and a 4.8 adults 18–49 demo rating, making it the highest-rated fall debut for a Fox scripted show since 2001. Particular praise has been given to the performances of Deschanel, Greenfield, Simone, Johnson and Morris. Max Greenfield was considered the show's breakout star in season 1, before critics named Jake Johnson the breakout star of season 2. The show has been nominated for several awards, including five Golden Globe Awards and five Primetime Emmy Awards.

On May 14, 2017, Fox renewed the series for a seventh and final season consisting of eight episodes, which premiered on April 10, 2018. The show has garnered an increased mainstream following since its inclusion on Netflix, becoming one of the most popular shows on the platform. The series finale aired on May 15, 2018.

Plot

Jessica "Jess" Day (Zooey Deschanel) is a bubbly and quirky teacher in her late 20s who comes home to find her boyfriend, Spencer, with another woman and leaves him immediately to look for somewhere else to live. After answering an ad for a new roommate on Craigslist, she finds herself moving into a loft in Los Angeles with three men around her own age: Nick, Schmidt, and Coach. After the pilot episode, Winston, a former roommate and Nick's childhood friend, replaces Coach, who had vacated the apartment to live with his girlfriend. Cece, Jess's childhood best friend and a successful fashion model, frequently visits Jess and the guys.

The series follows the group's amusing interactions with each other as they become closer friends, and their romantic relationships. Midway through season 1, Schmidt and Cece get involved in a mostly sexual relationship but break up at the end of the season. In Season 2, Jess is laid off from her teaching job; she and the others get involved in mostly temporary relationships, although Cece enters an arranged marriage engagement with Shivrang (Satya Bhabha) that is broken up at their wedding in the season 2 finale. The season 2 finale features Taylor Swift, Shivrang's love interest when he and Cece do not go through with their wedding. Cece realizes that she loves Schmidt because of how selfless he is. Jess and Nick become romantically attracted to each other, making their relationship official at the end of season 2, and it lasts through most of season 3. Coach returns to the loft in season 3 after revealing that he had broken up with his girlfriend and stays through season 4 where he moves out to be with another girl, May (Meaghan Rath). After bouncing around several random jobs, Winston works to become a police officer with the LAPD, and falls in love with his partner Aly (Nasim Pedrad). At the end of season 4, Schmidt proposes to Cece, and they marry at the end of season 5. Schmidt's famous line to Cece is that "being brown, you have the wisdom of 100 white women." Also, in season 5, while Jess is on jury duty, the group brings in temporary roommate Reagan Lucas (Megan Fox), whom Nick becomes interested in. For a while, Reagan becomes Nick's love interest but they break up. In season 6, Schmidt and Cece buy a house together that they have to remodel, living with the gang in the meantime. Season 7 advances the storyline three years later where Schmidt and Cece have a three-year-old daughter named Ruth, Winston and Aly are expecting their first baby, and Nick proposes to Jess.

Cast and characters

The principal cast of New Girl includes:
 Zooey Deschanel as Jessica "Jess" Day: a bubbly, offbeat teacher in her early thirties who is originally from Portland, Oregon. In the premiere episode, she moves into the guys' apartment where Nick, Schmidt, and Coach help her move on from a painful break-up with her boyfriend, Spencer. She begins rooming with them.
 Jake Johnson as Nick Miller: Jess's roommate who works as a bartender. At the start of the series, he struggles with a break-up with his long-term girlfriend Caroline.
 Max Greenfield as Schmidt: Jess's roommate is a seemingly confident ladies' man. He is a successful marketing associate in a female-dominated office.
 Lamorne Morris as Winston Bishop: a former basketball player and Nick's childhood friend from Chicago. Losing his post as point guard for a team in the Latvian Basketball League, he returns to America and moves back into the guys' apartment in the second episode.
 Hannah Simone as Cece: a fashion model and Jess's best friend since childhood. In spite of their differences, Cece is a very loyal and protective friend to Jess. Initially skeptical of Jess's new roommates, Cece becomes interested in Schmidt and integrates herself more and more socially with the others as time progresses.
 Damon Wayans Jr. as Coach (pilot, season 4; special guest seasons 3 & 5–7): a cocky and driven former athlete who works as a personal trainer. He appears briefly in the "Pilot" episode as a roommate but has left in the second episode. After a break-up with his girlfriend, Coach returns to the loft two years later and reintegrates himself back into the lives of his former roommates.
 Danielle and Rhiannon Rockoff as Ruth (season 7): Schmidt and Cece's three-year-old daughter.

Production

Conception

20th Century Fox Television first approached playwright Elizabeth Meriwether in 2008 to develop a pilot that was eventually shelved. After Meriwether's success with the 2011 romantic comedy film  No Strings Attached, 20th Century Fox approached her once more, and she pitched an idea for a TV sitcom about an "offbeat girl moving in with three single guys", inspired by her experience of "bouncing from Craigslist sublet to Craigslist sublet, for four years in L.A." when she was in her twenties. This show was initially called Chicks and Dicks, and two of the characters were already similar to the final characters of Jess and Schmidt. The initial idea was a Will & Grace-style comedy inspired by Meriwether's close friendship with a guy after their exes started dating each other. The FOX network liked the script and pursued Zooey Deschanel for the role of Jess, to whose story Meriwether felt most connected. As the script developed, the plot moved on from being about the sexual endeavors of the roommates and became more socially oriented, so the title was changed to New Girl.

As Fox greenlit the show in 2011 and ordered an initial 13 episodes, Meriwether approached Jake Kasdan, whom she admired for his work on Freaks and Geeks blending comedy and emotion, to shoot the pilot and subsequent episodes. 30 Rock Brett Baer and Dave Finkel became co-showrunners, although Meriwether is still regarded as the voice behind New Girl. According to The New Republic, Kasdan "helped develop the feel of the show, which is lit more darkly and cinematically than the average sitcom", and Meriwether found the show working best "when you're laughing, but you're a little sad about it". The show attempts to combine "comedy and drama as the five characters explore the difficulties of the decade between 30 and 40, which is when many people take their biggest steps toward maturity" in regards to relationships and careers, which, unlike Friends, is giving the show a "built-in biological clock". Kasdan said that "Their lives are moving forward, [but] they're still trying to hang on to some kind of crazy youth" although he does not "want them ever to seem pathetic."

Screenwriters Stephanie Counts and Shari Gold filed an 87-page lawsuit in January 2014, claiming that New Girl was based on their 2006 script for a proposed television series. There were a number of similarities, including the number of roommates, similar backgrounds, appearance, and ethnicity.  Additionally, Jess's long-term partner in the New Girl pilot had the same name (Spencer) and they broke up for similar reasons (partner's infidelity).  Fox and talent agency William Morris Endeavor Entertainment LLC responded in April 2014 that in their view, the two works were not substantially similar and that any other similarities stemmed from non-protectable ideas, or scenes a faire. Thus, they pleaded that the judge dismiss the case.  The case was dismissed with leave to amend in 2014.  An amended complaint was filed in 2014 and decided by summary judgment against Counts and Gold on December 30, 2015.  In March 2016, Counts and Gold were ordered to pay approximately $800,000 in attorney's fees.

Casting
Movie actress and singer-songwriter Zooey Deschanel was in the process of developing an HBO show when she read the New Girl pilot script and responded to the material. The character of Jess was not specifically written for Deschanel, but the producers found it a great match and needed little fine-tuning. With the support from Fox, Meriwether wanted to make Jess a unique, interesting and funny female character that would have been the side character on other shows. Deschanel became a producer on the show and helped build the character, requesting to not play the classic wife character who would be ignored by the guys she tries to keep out of trouble. Meriwether's goal was to write about herself from an honest perspective, with Jess mirroring her at the start and later Deschanel until Jess turned into a "hybrid of me and Zooey, the writers, and the editor". Deschanel described Jess as a part of her, especially in regards to "the sort of enthusiasm and optimism" of her youth. She does not shy away from playing embarrassing scenes or being unattractive, and Kasdan said that "This show advocates for the attractive dork." Although Meriwether had always imagined the show as an ensemble show, Fox would later focus its first marketing push on Zooey Deschanel and gave the show the promotional tagline "Simply Adorkable."

With Kasdan's advice to cast good actors and write for them instead of shoehorning them into the other roles, Meriwether was prepared to deviate from her pitched characters during casting. Basing Nick Miller on a friend also surnamed Miller, she originally imagined Nick as the smartest one of the group who doesn't need to say that and thought of him as "the everyman one, who's stepping away and commenting on what all the crazy people are doing around him." She sent the New Girl pilot script to movie actor Jake Johnson, with whom she had enjoyed working on No Strings Attached. As he had never auditioned for a TV pilot, she guided him through the audition process. Casting was done mainly through chemistry tests, and Johnson auditioned with Max Greenfield, who impressed the producers in his first audition as Schmidt. The actors auditioning for Schmidt were more varied in appearance than those auditioning for Nick, and Johnson and Greenfield were initially worried that they looked too much alike. Johnson got the role of Nick after he agreed to lose 15 pounds at the network's request; Greenfield learned the same day that he was cast.

Casting the role of the "Coach" character took longer. Meriwether originally envisioned Coach as "a fat Jewish guy, like a manchild" and later as "this dumb jock [with] crazy rage problems". David Neher (who would play Schmidt's so-called "fremesis," Benjamin, in four episodes) was among the 400 actors auditioning for Coach before the producers settled on Damon Wayans Jr. Wayans was expecting his show, the ABC sitcom Happy Endings, to be cancelled. When that show was renewed for a second season, Wayans' spot was replaced with Lamorne Morris, who had also read for Coach but had been unavailable for filming the pilot. Meriwether estimated that about 80 percent of the pilot would have needed to be re-shot in order to remove Wayans from the episode, since he was in one of the leading roles of the show. As the producers also liked reflecting the frequent apartment changes in young people's lives, Meriwether, 20th Century Fox and the studio decided to keep the characters and the plot of the pilot episode as they were. Morris joined the show in the second episode of the series when the producers had already broken seven episodes without knowing what the actor was going to be able to do. Wayans returned to New Girl in season 3 for a season-long arc after Happy Endings had been cancelled, and was officially added as a regular for season 4.

Writing
The New Girl production offices were on the Fox lot in Los Angeles. New Girl had 11 writers during its first season and 15 during the second seasonincluding Elizabeth Meriwether, Brett Baer, and Dave Finkel. Stories were developed in a collaborative effort and are aimed at viewers of both sexes. The first season had no planned story arcs, but focused on setting up the characters, while the second season was to show different sides of the characters. Overarching storylines usually culminated at a season's end; the actors were generally not told the ending. Creator/showrunner Meriwether said the writers did not "have a lot of plans. I think we really just to try to go where the show wants to go." The writers challenged themselves to create new stories and to change the show's dynamics to keep things fresh, while aiming to be "as emotionally real as possible" with "Every story having to feel like it was grounded in some emotional arc as opposed to going from the joke into the story." As the show's jokes rely on the actors' performance instead of perfectly constructed punch lines, Meriwether looked for the actors' strengths before writing. The A story generally revolved around Jess and had an emotional core. Still, Meriwether saw the show as an ensemble about friendship with "everybody having their own stories and people being interested in all of the characters."

Each New Girl episode started out as a pitch page, went through stages of an outline and a final draft before being filmed and edited, a process which could take weeks. Each stage was approved by Meriwether and her co-showrunners, by the production company Chernin, the Fox studio and the Fox network. One group of writers worked on alternate punchlines ("alts"), while another group reworked a draft until they find the funniest and most emotionally resonant version. All characters are aimed to be tied into the story, and determining their motivation is the major goal so that people will laugh. Before taking the script to the table read with the whole cast on Tuesday, the main writers of an episode continued working on the draft over the weekend and the executive producers polish it. During the first season, Meriwether usually made a final pass at the draft alone because of her film and theater background. The actors' performance influences new story ideas; the actors may also hand in story ideas.

Filming and editing
The main set, which was built for the pilot and is to represent a factory-turned-loft in downtown Los Angeles, got reused once the show was given a full season. The apartment building exterior is the Binford Building, located at 837 Traction Avenue in the city's Arts District, with interior shots done in a studio set.  The exterior shots for the bar where Nick works is of The Griffin, located in Atwater Village. The interior shots of the bar are originally from a restaurant called The Prince in Koreatown, and were recreated in a studio set after the first season.

As a single-camera comedy, New Girl is neither performed in front of a studio audience nor has a laugh track. Some scenes are cross-covered (i.e. are filmed with a shooting camera on each person at the same time), to allow for better improvisations. Handheld cameras are avoided for a more filmic look.

The actors first receive the script in form of a table draft and film the episode the next Monday, by which time the story may have changed drastically. The script keeps evolving during shooting. The actors first perform scenes as written, then act out the alts or improvise, to later allow the producers and editors to choose the gags that ultimately work best. Morris estimated that 20 percent of each episode are improv. Episodes are generally shot over five days, which may increase to several weeks if weather conditions delay filming outdoor scenes. The scenes are put together in the editing room until they achieve the emotional and comedic tone the producers are looking for. The first cut of generally 27 minutes has to be cut down to the air version's 21 minutes and 35 seconds, which may air as little as a few days later. Only upon completion do the producers know what version ends up in the episode.

True American
True American is a fictional, convoluted drinking game that the New Girl characters first played in the season 1 episode 20, "Normal". In September 2012, producer Brett Baer felt the concept of the game "deserves its own episode at some point", but the writers were reluctant to repeat the established rules and rather wanted to make it fresh. A version for the 2012 U.S. Presidential Election was planned but never made. The game's eventual second appearance in season 2's "Cooler" was played with the strip-poker version "Clinton Rules", but the exact rules remain unclear even to the actors. True American with updated rules and the resulting hangover were featured in season 3's "Mars Landing". The writers started to do new True American episodes once each year.

After "Normal" aired, internet sources began to summarize the rules for True American, which the characters described as a mix of a drinking game and Candy Land where the floor is lava; it also involves shouting the names of American presidents. The idea of True American came from a New Girl writer who played a similar game in college. As she could not remember the game's exact rules, the writers focused on making the game as funny on the page as possible, but only established chanting "JFK! FDR!" and walking on chairs. As the cast did not understand the game during shooting, the writers created more rules on the spot, advised the actors to "have fun, dig in, jump in" and play it as if "they'd been playing this thing for years and years and years." The high-energy feel of the game and the amounts of coverage made filming True American more challenging for the actors than normal episodes. Producers Dave Finkel, Brett Baer, and writer Luvh Rakhe, came up with most of the obscure American history facts, but much was cut from the finished episode.

Fox subsequently released a set of official rules for the game, which can be summarized "There are no real rules". When the promotional New Girl True American Bus Tour went through 19 American cities in 2012, the writers stated lack of time rather than not knowing the rules for not writing down the rules. Liz Meriwether said the game would not be easier to comprehend in later appearances, as the writers' goal is to actually make it harder to understand. She agreed with The A.V. Club that "It's much funnier if the rules make no sense." As more people attempted playing the game in real life, Baer pointed out that most people were "getting too drunk too fast" and did not focus enough on strategy, so the writers were thinking of establishing more rules for guidance. Meriwether advised to "just trust your hearts, get really wasted, and look inside yourselves. I think you'll find the rules were there all along."

Relationships
Creator Elizabeth Meriwether sees Nick, Schmidt and Winston "on the weirder side of things". The producers started learning more about the characters by seeing the actors' work and that "We probably rely on them more than we should" to define the characters. For example, the producers found more variety in Nick's character in season 1 and enjoyed Johnson's improvisations, so they relayed Coach's attributed rage issues to Nick. Nick is a childhood friend of Winston, has been best friends with Schmidt since his college days and becomes close to Jess, so his character connects the most with the other loft mates and is often part of their stories. Jake Johnson (Nick) noted the contrast to the original plans for his character, as season 1 turned Nick into "an idiot, he's not keeping anyone together", and that he did not fully understand his character in season 1, partly because the character might not have figured himself out at the age of 30. Johnson felt that initially it seemed like Nick hated Schmidt for being a douchebag, but the show later teamed them up like The Odd Couple, showing their genuine friendship and simultaneous idiocy as they get into trouble. According to Johnson, he and Max Greenfield (Schmidt) "couldn't be more different [as actors] and it's very much like Nick and Schmidt, but we both really get a kick out of the other guy" on set.

Winston came into New Girl later on, the writers developed the Nick–Winston dynamic in season 1 and sought to figure out Winston's relationship with the other loft mates in season 2. The writers noticed late during the first season that Morris seemed better suited to play a smart character and act as the loft's voice of reason, although Meriwether found that when Winston "finally does blow up, he's crazier than all of them" and that he works better "in these kind of crazy, comedic runners, small pieces of the episode" that contrast the relationship dramas of the other main characters. The Winston–Schmidt friendship was developed significantly in the second half of season 2 when the story focus moved to Nick and Jess. The Nick–Jess relationship affects the three guys' friendship as Nick starts being more considerate of Jess' feelings regarding shenanigans. Damon Wayans Jr. was planned to reprise his role as Coach in at least four episodes in the third season, according to Meriwether "at a time when the roommates are at odds with each other" and "The guys are all fighting for his friendship." The three guys will get intimidated by Coach's return, as he has "this alpha male aggression" and is "that macho, tough-talking guy that they all think is so cool".

With Meriwether's openness regarding straight and gay communities, New Girl also plays with the guys' sexual orientation for humor. One of Winston's recurring alternate persona is Nick's gay lover "Theodore K. Mullins", which started out as an improv of Lamorne Morris (Winston). Johnson thought that Nick and Schmidt had "a pretty funny bromance" with "their own little weird will-they-won't-they". Greenfield improvised kissing Nick a lot in season 1 until the writers (“finally” according to Greenfield) started putting Schmidt–Nick kisses into the script, so that they shared more kisses than Nick and Jess did in the first two seasons. The season 2 episode "Models" came about when Meriwether thought the show "needed a love story between Nick and Schmidt or something. We wanted to tell it like a classic rom-com story about Nick and Schmidt and their love of each other".

Episodes

Broadcast and ratings
The New Girl pilot was released via on-demand, iTunes, and TiVo on September 6, 2011 before its September 20 premiere on Fox in the United States and on City in Canada. Other international broadcasters include Channel 4 and E4 in the United Kingdom, RTÉ2 in the Republic of Ireland, Network Ten and Eleven in Australia, and Four in New Zealand. The pilot episode drew 10.28 million U.S. viewers and a 4.8 adults 18–49 demo rating, making it the highest-rated fall debut for a Fox scripted show since The Bernie Mac Show in 2001. The second episode made New Girl the top-rated show on television in the marketing-important 18–49 demographic, improved the rating of its lead-in hit series Glee and beat the long-running hit series NCIS and Dancing with the Stars. At this time, Fox ordered 11 additional episodes to the initial 13-episode order, bringing the first season to 24 episodes.

The ratings dropped considerably when the show took a break for baseball, plunging almost 20 percent to a 2.1 rating in the 18–49 audience group. During the 2011–12 television season, New Girl averaged 8.22 million viewers and a 4.2 adults 18–49 demo rating. In 18–49 demo, it ranked as the fifth highest rated show on Fox and 13th overall. On April 9, 2012, New Girl was officially renewed for a second season of 24 episodes; Fox ordered one more episode during the second half of the season.

On March 4, 2013, the series was renewed for a third season, which premiered on September 17, 2013. New Girl ratings were cited as an example for changed audience behavior: when including its Live+7 (days) results instead of just Live+SD (same day), the show's viewership almost doubled in the week of October 13–20, 2013, by jumping 89 percent, that week's the biggest percentage gain, to a 3.6 demo rating. The total audience of the episode "Sister" grew by 112 percent over thirty days on multi platforms, compared to the Live+SD rating of 3.4. The post-Super Bowl episode "Prince" holds the show's Live+SD viewership record of 26.30 million viewers. New Girl was renewed for a fourth season on March 7, 2014, and renewed for a fifth season on March 31, 2015.

Syndication
The series was added to TBS's line-up on August 17, 2015. Additionally, the sitcom was added to MTV in the fall of 2015 for a short-lived run.

Home media

Tie-ins
 A 2012 book, The Douche Journals: The Definitive Account of One Man's Genius, compiled the many Schmidtisms from The Douchebag Jar, before Jess moved into the apartment. 
 in January 2022, iHeartRadio launched the New Girl rewatch podcast Welcome to Our Show, hosted by Deschanel, Simone, and Morris, who reminisce on their experience filming the show and provide behind the scenes details on its production.

Reception

Critical reviews
On the review aggregator website Rotten Tomatoes, season one holds an approval rating of 84% based on 32 reviews, with an average rating of 6.83/10.
The site's critical consensus reads, "Zooey Deschanel's offbeat style gets a worthy showcase in New Girl, and while it can get awfully cutesy at times, the show benefits from witty writing and a strong supporting cast." Metacritic, which uses a weighted average, assigned the season a score of 66 out of 100 based on 25 critics, indicating "generally favorable reviews".

In June 2011, New Girl was one of eight honorees in the "most exciting new series" category at the 1st Critics' Choice Television Awards, voted by journalists who had seen the pilots. Robert Bianco of USA Today considered New Girl "fall's most promising new series" and praised how Deschanel and Meriwether "have shaped Jess into something we haven't quite seen before – a woman who is sweet yet crass, innocent yet sexy, beautiful yet clumsy, and brash yet irresistibly adorable." However, he noted how "Some people will be resistant to Deschanel's doe-eyed charm; others have a congenital need to insult anyone who most everyone else is praising, particularly if doing so gets them attention." The Hollywood Reporter Tim Goodman saw the show as a "mostly romantic comedy", and although Jess' adorability "might seem like a thin premise, [...] Meriwether manages to make the situations funny and lets Deschanel channel her charm – a winning combination." David Wiegand of the San Francisco Chronicle would rather see the show tone down. He felt "the show's fundamental setup isn't all that inspired, but it could work with smarter writing and better direction, especially with regard to Deschanel", who, in his opinion, overplayed Jess' weird habits "to the point of overkill within the first 10 minutes of the show".

Alan Sepinwall of HitFix considered New Girl "the best new comedy of the fall season, and the only new show I genuinely enjoyed from start to finish" because it was so well developed from the start. He praised Deschanel's "wonderful comic performance" and said that while the supporting actors "all bounce nicely off of Deschanel", the scenes without Deschanel around them fell flat for him. Writing for the Daily News, David Hinckley lauded how none of the characters "settle in as the stereotypes they could easily become", and presumed that all of them would evolve and get smarter as the show progresses. Lori Rack of the Chicago Sun-Times praised the actors' comedic timing and playing off each other. Despite the guys sounding "like nightmares" on paper, "they have endearing, vulnerable cores that make them likable, and occasionally, lovable. [...] New Girl didn't give me as many laugh-out-loud moments as some comedies", but instead made her "feel warm and fuzzy". Rob Owen of the Pittsburgh Post-Gazette said the show's pilot was "more charming than hilarious" and "cuter than it is funny, but when it does conjure laughs, its style of humor is reminiscent of ABC's Happy Endings".

Critics questioned the portrayal of Jess' girlishness early on. Phillip Maciak of Slant Magazine initially expected New Girl as one of 2011's many new female-centric shows to "be an exemplar of this new age of empowerment", but found instead that "New Girl presents us with a narratively scattered, male fantasy of a show about a cooing woman-child in a polka-dot skirt who literally can't say the word 'penis' without giggling." Meriwether stated it was not the show's goal to create a symbol and, pointing to gender double standards, rejected opinions that Jess was emblematic of all women. She "was really just writing about myself, and so my main goal is just to give Zooey, really fun, interesting things to do every week, and then just be really honest with myself about the character and present an interesting, funny female character on television." Critics felt the first-season episode "Jess & Julia" was a meta reference to Jess' girliness and the initial "adorkable" ad campaign for New Girl, but Meriwether stated the episode was more a response to a controversial New York magazine cover story about Deschanel's personality and her views on women's issues.

Summarizing the first two seasons, Jon Caramanica of The New York Times said "Jess fit into no known mode, sitcom or interpersonal. For much of the [first] season, she remained a cipher. Her interactions with the rest of the crew were unfailingly odd—there was no common language, and that was the root of the show's comedic alchemy, or lack thereof. By the end of that first season, Jess' sharp angles had been sandpapered down a bit, but the show's second season [...] represented a change in approach that has rescued New Girl from its whimsy and turned it into one of the most reliable and reliably affecting sitcoms on television. At root, these changes sprang from the recognition that Ms. Deschanel's charms lie not in her quirk but in her empathy and warmth." Variety Cynthia Littleton summarized that "The show has drawn praise from critics for its deft mix of offbeat humor that captures the voice of contempo 20-somethings and laugh-out-loud moments, aided by Deschanel's flair for physical comedy." HuffPost Maureen Ryan said New Girl second season was "doing an ace job of mixing sharp comedic moments and goofball weirdness with excellent character-building."

Many critics considered Max Greenfield the show's breakout star in season 1; The A.V. Club even named Greenfield's Schmidt "the year's breakout TV character" as a "douchebag with a heart of gold". Salon described Schmidt as "a sort of self-created alpha male and a collection of beta male qualities [... which] are performed with such conviction they congeal into a sort of deranged machismo, one slathered in sandalwood-scented lotion. As part of this transition, Schmidt has gone from being a douchebag in the classic model—a guy who, in the pilot, constantly wanted to show off his pecs and scam girls, and seemed capable of doing so—to a douche of a more unique variety." The Huffington Post Maureen Ryan said how "Schmidt could have easily been 'the dumb guy', or the show could have exploited his status as an eminently mockable douche. But thanks to Max Greenfield's endearing depiction of the would-be lady-killer, there's a lot more the writers have been able to do with the character." Caramanica lamented how Winston as the lone black character "is still an outlier, though far less so than in the first season. He's a sharp foil when other characters, especially Schmidt, get too racially comfortable."

On Rotten Tomatoes, season two holds an approval rating of 88% based on 16 reviews, with an average rating of 6.56/10.
The site's critical consensus reads, "New Girls terrific ensemble cast remains its most valuable asset, and the show is buoyed by a deeper, more relatable central performance from lead Zooey Deschanel in its sophomore season." After the teasing of the Nick–Jess relationship in the first season, critics named Jake Johnson the breakout star of season 2 as the characters' romance unfolded. Saying that "Not since Ross and Rachel's tango on Friends has watching a comedy romance been so satisfying", The Hollywood Reporter said the producers "did the impossible by engaging their leads in a love story, which only strengthened the artistry of the single-cam comedy". The New York Times said season 2 "erupted in fantastic and bizarre fits and starts" because of the characters' unmatched personalities, and lauded the writers for not playing up the will-they-or-won't-they dynamic. By emphasizing how the characters got together, the show "made for hilarious setups [that occasionally led] to high-level Abbott and Costello slapstick. They have a modern love. [...] Together, they are fully functional. They make each other human." The Huffington Post Maureen Ryan was unconcerned about getting Jess and Nick together, as because of immaturity "they're bound to keep on making a lot of amusing and painful mistakes, sometimes with each other. Those choices can be both hilarious and sad, and New Girl has gotten a lot of mileage out of both those areas." The continued Nick–Jess relationship was criticized in season 3 for dropping the characters' personalities, lack of tension, and for neglecting the show's female friendship between Jess and Cece. TV Guide Natalie Abrams felt that during the first half of season 3 that "bringing them together caused that [former] spark [between them] to diminish", while Hitfix Alan Sepinwall and The A.V. Club David Sims found that the show's perceived decline in quality had less to do with the Nick–Jess relationship but with the handling of Schmidt's cheating arc and the re-introduction of Coach.

On Rotten Tomatoes, season three holds an approval rating of 88% based on 14 reviews, with an average rating of 6.46/10.
The site's critical consensus reads, "Though it falls within a common sitcom template, New Girl brings laughter by spotlighting funny and genuine characters that are imperfect in relatable ways." Season four holds an approval rating of 100% based on 10 reviews, with an average rating of 6.67/10. The site's critical consensus reads, "New Girls fourth season benefits from a renewed cast chemistry reminiscent of season two." The series' seventh and final season has an approval rating of 100% based on 10 reviews, with an average rating of 6.78, and a critical consensus of, "After seven years of friendship, New Girl signs off with a thoughtful, funny final season that bids a proper adieu to its colorful cast of characters." 

Variety has quoted Zooey Deschanel saying that "we were ready for it to be the end, in a bittersweet way...It was like finishing a marathon, like we did this really long run for seven years and we've played these characters a long time. It's not like there was any unfinished business".

Awards and nominations

The show has been nominated for several awards, including five Golden Globe Awards and five Primetime Emmy Awards.

References

External links

 
 

 
2011 American television series debuts
2018 American television series endings
2010s American romantic comedy television series
2010s American single-camera sitcoms
English-language television shows
Fox Broadcasting Company original programming
Television series by 20th Century Fox Television
Television shows featuring audio description
Television shows filmed in Los Angeles
Television shows set in Los Angeles
2010s American sitcoms
Television series by Chernin Entertainment
Television shows scored by Ludwig Göransson
American LGBT-related sitcoms